Carlester T. Crumpler is a former American football tight end.  He played for the Seattle Seahawks (1994–1998) and the Minnesota Vikings (1999) of the National Football League (NFL).  He is the son of former Buffalo Bills player Carlester Crumpler, the older brother of former Pro Bowl tight end Alge Crumpler, and brother of musician Bryan Crumpler.

Crumpler graduated from Junius H. Rose High School. He received a B.A. in finance and an MBA from East Carolina University, where he played tight end for the Pirates. Crumpler was an All American in 1993 as he was selected to the 1993 Walter Camp team as the best tight end in college football.

References

External links
 

1971 births
Living people
American football tight ends
East Carolina Pirates football players
Minnesota Vikings players
Seattle Seahawks players
Sportspeople from Greenville, North Carolina
Players of American football from North Carolina
African-American players of American football
21st-century African-American sportspeople
20th-century African-American sportspeople